Finau Maka (born 10 July 1977) started his playing career for Auckland Rugby Union and NZ age group teams. He played over 50 games for Auckland NPC Team and the Hurricanes, Blues and Highlanders before leaving to play for the Stade Toulousain club in French Top 14. Whilst at Toulouse he helped them win the 2003, 2005 and 2010 Heineken Cups, as a replacement in 2003 and starting in the 2005 final. He played in two Rugby World Cups for Tonga and was one of the stars of the 2007 Rugby World Cup. In 2011 he led his country to beat France in the biggest upset in Rugby World Cup history. France went on to almost beat the All Blacks in the final.

2007 Rugby World Cup
Maka made his international debut in the 2007 Rugby World Cup, in Tonga's first pool game against the United States of America. He opened the scoring with a try in the second minute. He went on to seal his spot as the first choice number 8 for Tonga against Samoa, South Africa and England.

Boxing
In 2014, Maka fought against David Letele for the Duco Event's Corporate World Title. The day before the fight at the weigh in both fighters got into a fight. Letele grabbed Maka on the throat pushing him back, Maka retaliated by tackling him to the ground, however the fight was broken off quickly. Maka lost by TKO in the first round.

Professional boxing record

| style="text-align:center;" colspan="8"|0 Wins (0 knockouts, 0 decisions), 1 Losses (1 knockouts, 0 decisions), 0 Draws 
|-  style="text-align:center; background:#e3e3e3;"
|  style="border-style:none none solid solid; "|Res.
|  style="border-style:none none solid solid; "|Record
|  style="border-style:none none solid solid; "|Opponent
|  style="border-style:none none solid solid; "|Type
|  style="border-style:none none solid solid; "|Rd., Time
|  style="border-style:none none solid solid; "|Date
|  style="border-style:none none solid solid; "|Location
|  style="border-style:none none solid solid; "|Notes
|- align=center
|Loss
|0–1
|align=left| David Letele
|
|
|
|align=left|
|align=left|

References

External links 
 Finau Maka player profile Scrum.com

1977 births
Living people
Tongan rugby union players
Expatriate rugby union players in France
Tonga international rugby union players
Pacific Islanders rugby union players
Stade Toulousain players
Tongan expatriate rugby union players
New Zealand rugby union players
Tongan emigrants to New Zealand
Tongan expatriate sportspeople in France
People from Tongatapu
Rugby union flankers
Rugby union number eights
Tongan male boxers
Ponsonby RFC players
Provence Rugby players
New Zealand expatriate sportspeople in France
Hurricanes (rugby union) players
People educated at Sacred Heart College, Auckland
Highlanders (rugby union) players
Auckland rugby union players
Blues (Super Rugby) players